Anne Lister (3 April 1791 – 22 September 1840) was an English diarist, famous for revelations for which she was dubbed "the first modern lesbian".

Lister was from a minor landowning family at Shibden in Calderdale, West Riding of Yorkshire, and conducted multiple lesbian affairs from her schooldays onwards, often on long trips abroad. Muscular and masculine in appearance, dressed only in black, and highly educated, she was later known, generally unkindly, as "Gentleman Jack". Her final significant relationship was with Ann Walker, to whom she was notionally married in Holy Trinity Church, Goodramgate, York, now celebrated as the birthplace of lesbian marriage in Britain.

Lister's diaries reveal much about contemporary life in West Yorkshire, including her development of historic Shibden Hall, and her interests in landscaping, mining, railways, and canals. Many entries were written in code that was not decrypted until long after her death. These graphic portrayals of lesbianism were so frank that they were thought to be a hoax until their authenticity was confirmed.

Life

Anne Lister was the second child and eldest daughter of Jeremy Lister (1753–1836) who, as a young man in 1775, served with the British 10th Regiment of Foot in the Battles of Lexington and Concord in the American War of Independence. In August 1788, he married Rebecca Battle (1770–1817) of Welton in East Riding, Yorkshire. Their first child, John, was born in 1789 but died the same year. Anne Lister was born in Halifax on 3 April 1791. In 1793, the family moved to an estate named Skelfler House at Market Weighton. Skelfler was where young Anne spent her earliest years. A second son, Samuel, who was close to Anne, was born in 1793. The Listers had four sons and three daughters, but only Anne and her younger sister, Marian (born 13 October 1798), survived past 20 years old.

At the age of seven, she was sent to a school run by a Mrs Hagues and a Mrs Chettle in Agnesgate, Ripon. Between 1801 and 1804, Lister was educated at home by the Reverend George Skelding, the vicar of Market Weighton. On her visits to her aunt Anne and uncle James at Shibden Hall, the Misses Mellin gave her lessons. In 1804, Anne Lister was sent to the Manor House School in York (in the King's Manor buildings), where Anne met her first love, Eliza Raine (1791–1860). Eliza was the illegitimate, half-Indian daughter of an East India Company surgeon in Madras, brought to Yorkshire after his death and set to inherit a substantial amount of money. Anne and Eliza shared a bedroom at the boarding school, but Anne was asked to leave after two years. Eliza expected to live with Anne as an adult, but Anne began affairs with other women including Isabella Norcliffe and Mariana Belcombe. In despair and frustration, Eliza became a patient at Clifton House Asylum, run by Mariana's father, William, in 1814. Eliza Raine was later transferred to Terrace House in Osbaldwick and died there on 31 January 1860 and is buried in the Osbaldwick churchyard across the road.

While being educated at home, Lister developed an interest in classical literature. In a surviving letter to her aunt from 3 February 1803, a young Lister explains "My library is my greatest pleasure... The Grecian History had pleased me much."

She inherited the Shibden estate on her uncle's death in 1826, but only controlled part of its income until both her father's and her aunt's deaths in 1836, when their shares of the income passed to her. Her wealth allowed her some measure of freedom to live as she pleased.

In addition to income from the agricultural tenancy, Lister's financial portfolio included properties in town, shares in the canal and railway industries, mining, and stone quarries. Lister used the income from this varied portfolio to finance her two passions, the renovation of Shibden Hall, and European travel.

Lister is described as having a "masculine appearance". One of her lovers, Mariana Lawton (née Belcombe), was initially ashamed to be seen in public with Lister because of the comments made on Lister's appearance. She dressed entirely in black (as was normal for gentlemen at the time) and took part in many activities that were not perceived as the norm for women of the time, such as opening and owning a colliery. She was referred to as "Gentleman Jack" in some quarters. Lawton and Lister were lovers for about two decades, including a period during which Lawton was married and to which her husband became resigned. In 1822, they visited the Ladies of Llangollen at Plas Newydd in Llangollen.

Although Lister had met her on various occasions in the 1820s, Ann Walker, who by 1832 had become a wealthy heiress, took on a much more substantial role in Lister's life. Eventually the women took communion together on Easter Sunday (30 March) 1834 in Holy Trinity Church, Goodramgate, York, and thereafter considered themselves married, but without legal recognition. The church has been described as "an icon for what is interpreted as the site of the first lesbian marriage to be held in Britain", and the building now hosts a commemorative blue plaque. The couple lived together at Shibden Hall until Lister's death in 1840.

Walker's fortune was used to improve Shibden Hall and the property's waterfall and lake. Lister renovated Shibden Hall quite significantly to her own design. In 1838, she added a Gothic tower to the main house, to serve as her private library. She also had a tunnel dug under the building which allowed the staff to move about without disturbing her.

Throughout her life, Lister had a strong Anglican faith, and also remained a Tory, "interested in defending the privileges of the land-owning aristocracy".

Travel

Lister greatly enjoyed travel, although her biographer Angela Steidele suggests her trips in later life were also a way to "evade the self realisation that she had failed at everything she set her hand to". She made her first trip to continental Europe in 1819, when she was 28 years old. She travelled with her 54-year-old aunt, also called Anne Lister, on a two-month trip to France.

In 1824, she returned to Paris and stayed until the following year. In 1826, she was back in Paris with her Aunt Anne, where she resumed an affair from her earlier visit to the city with a widow named Maria Barlow. In 1827, she set out from Paris with both Barlow and her Aunt Anne on a tour of northern Italy and Switzerland, returning to Shibden Hall the following year. In 1828, she travelled extensively in Scotland with Sibella MacLean.

She left for the continent again in 1829. With Paris as her base, she visited Belgium and Germany before heading south to the Pyrenees. Here she did hiking as well as crossed the border into Spain. While in Spain she demonstrated both her strong adventurous streak and considerable physical fitness by ascending Monte Perdido , the third highest peak in the Pyrenees.

Returning to Shibden Hall in 1831, she found life with her father and sister Marian so uncomfortable that she almost immediately left again, visiting the Netherlands for a short trip with Mariana Lawton. All in all, between 1826 and 1832, she only spent a short period of time at Shibden Hall, with travels around Britain and Europe allowing her to avoid her family at home.

In 1834, she again visited France and Switzerland, this time for her honeymoon with Ann Walker. Returning with Walker in 1838, she again headed south to the Pyrenees and completed the first "official" ascent of the Vignemale (10,820 feet; 3,298 m), the highest peak in the French Pyrenees. This required a ten-hour hike to reach the top and another seven hours to descend. 

Her last and greatest trip began in 1839. Leaving Shibden Hall in June with Walker and two servants, they travelled in their own carriage through France, Denmark, Sweden and Russia, arriving in St Petersburg in September and in Moscow in October. With a reluctant Walker in tow, she left Moscow in February 1840 in a new Russian carriage and very warm clothing. They travelled south, along the frozen Volga river, to the Caucasus. Few West Europeans had visited this area, let alone West European women, in part because of unrest amongst the local population against the Tsarist regime. At times they needed a military escort. The two women were a source of great curiosity to the people they visited. As Anne noted in her diary, "The people coming in to look at us as if we were some strange animals such as they had not seen the like before."

Death

Lister died on 22 September 1840, aged 49, of a fever at Koutais (now Kutaisi in Georgia) while travelling with Ann Walker. Walker had Lister's body brought back to the UK, where she was buried in Halifax Minster, on 29 April 1841. Her tombstone was rediscovered in 2000, having been covered by a floor in 1879.

In her will, Lister's estate was left to her paternal cousins, but Walker was given a life interest. After being declared to be of "unsound mind", she spent time briefly in Terrace House, a private House in Osbaldwick, and then in the London area with her sister and brother-in-law. Walker returned to Shibden Hall in 1845 and moved back to her family's estate in Lightcliffe in 1848. She died in 1854 at her childhood home, Cliff Hill in Lightcliffe, West Yorkshire.

More than 40 years after her death, while reporting on a dispute over the ownership of Shibden Hall, the Leeds Times in 1882 stated, "Miss Lister's masculine singularities of character are still remembered".

Diaries
During her life, Lister wrote a five-million-word diary. It began in 1806 as scraps of paper, recording in secret code parcels sent to and from Eliza Raine, and eventually became the 26 quarto volumes, ending at her death in 1840. In addition to her handwriting being incredibly difficult to decipher, around one-sixth of the diary is encrypted in a simple code Eliza and she had devised, combining the Greek alphabet, zodiac, punctuation, and mathematical symbols, and it describes in great detail her lesbian identity and affairs, as well as the methods she used for seduction. The diaries also contain her thoughts on the weather, social events, national events, and her business interests. The majority of her diary deals with her daily life, and not merely her sexuality, and provides detailed information on social, political, and economic events of the time.

The cypher used in her diaries was deciphered by the last inhabitant of Shibden Hall, John Lister (1847–1933) and a friend of his, Arthur Burrell. When the content of the secret passages was revealed, Burrell advised John Lister to burn all the diaries. Lister did not take this advice, but instead continued to hide Anne Lister's diaries behind a panel at Shibden Hall.

The cypher is as follows:
{| class=Wikitable
|- align=center
|  a  ||  b  ||  c  ||  d  ||  e  ||  f  ||  g  ||  h  ||  i  ||  j  ||  k  ||  l  ||  m  ||  n  ||  o  ||  p  ||  q  ||  r  ||  s  ||  t  ||  u  ||  v  ||  w  ||  x  ||  y  ||  z  ||  ch  ||  sh  ||  th  ||  & 
|- align=center
| 2 || ( || ) || 0 || 3 || v || n || o || 4 || 4 || ǀ || d || — || \ || 5 || + || ǁ || p || = || ~ || 6 || g || 8 || w || 7 || 9 || ∇ || Λ || 🗸 || ×
|}

In 2011, Lister's diaries were added to the register of the UNESCO Memory of the World Programme. The register citation notes that, while a valuable account of the times, it was the "comprehensive and painfully honest account of lesbian life and reflections on her nature, however, which have made these diaries unique. They have shaped and continue to shape the direction of UK Gender Studies and Women's History."

Lister's diaries have been described as part of a "trilogy of early 19th century diaries" by local women, covering the same period from different perspectives, along with those of Caroline Walker from 1812 to 1830, and Elizabeth Wadsworth from 1817 to 1829. In 2020, Ann Walker's own journal was discovered. Although brief, covering June 1834 to February 1835, it covers a pivotal period that weaves through the corresponding narratives in Lister's diary.

Research
Helena Whitbread published some of the diaries in two volumes (1988 and 1992). Their graphic nature meant at first they were believed by some to be a hoax, but documentary evidence has since established their authenticity. A biography by the academic Jill Liddington appeared in 1994. In 2014, a conference held at Shibden Hall focused on Lister's life along with gender and sexuality in the 19th century.

A biography by Angela Steidele in the German language was published in 2017, and published in English in 2018. In 2022 Russian researcher Olga Khoroshilova published a book about Lister's final and dramatic journey in Russia. In 2013, in an article by Chris Roulston, she was described as "the first modern lesbian".

Popular culture

Work by Dorothy Thompson and Patricia Hughes in the late 1980s at Birmingham University's Department of Modern History resulted in translation of much of the code, as well as discovery of the first juvenile Lister diaries and decoding of the other two Lister codes. Hughes self-published Anne Lister's Secret Diary for 1817 (2019) and The Early Life of Miss Anne Lister and the Curious Tale of Miss Eliza Raine (2015), both of which make extensive use of other materials in the Lister archives including letters, diaries, and ancillary documents.

The first episode of the 1994 BBC Two series A Skirt Through History, titled "A Marriage", features Julia Ford as Anne Lister, and Sophie Thursfield as Marianna Belcombe.

On 31 May 2010, BBC Two broadcast a production based on Lister's life, The Secret Diaries of Miss Anne Lister, starring Maxine Peake as Lister. Revealing Anne Lister, a documentary featuring Sue Perkins, was broadcast on the same night on BBC Two.

Chamber folk duo O'Hooley & Tidow included a song about Anne Lister, "Gentleman Jack", on their 2012 album The Fragile.

The 2019 BBC-HBO historical TV drama series Gentleman Jack, starring Suranne Jones as Lister, depicts her life as "the first modern lesbian". The series is billed as "inspired by" two books about Lister by Jill Liddington, Female Fortune and Nature's Domain. Liddington also acted as a consultant for the series. O'Hooley & Tidow's "Gentleman Jack" serves as the series' closing theme music. In 2019 Penguin Books published a companion volume by the series' senior consultant, Anne Choma, which includes newly transcribed and decoded entries from Lister's diaries.

In 2022 a second series of Gentleman Jack aired, first on the BBC One between 10 April and 29 May, and then on HBO between 25 April and 13 June. Shortly after the second series ended a campaign was started to renew the show, which then transformed into an effort to save the show as on 7 July it was announced that Gentleman Jack had been cancelled by HBO.

Plaque

In 2018, a blue plaque was unveiled at Holy Trinity Church in York to honour Lister; it was York's first LGBT history plaque. The plaque had rainbow edging, and read "Gender-nonconforming entrepreneur. Celebrated marital commitment, without legal recognition, to Ann Walker in this church. Easter, 1834". The wording was criticised for not mentioning Lister's sexuality, and in 2019, it was replaced with a similar plaque with the wording "Anne Lister 1791–1840 of Shibden Hall, Halifax / Lesbian and Diarist; took sacrament here to seal her union with Ann Walker / Easter 1834".

See also
 Boston marriage
 Anne Lister College

Notes

References

Sources
 Choma, Anne, Gentleman Jack: The Real Anne Lister. (Penguin Books & BBC Books, 2019)
Green, Muriel, Miss Lister of Shibden Hall: Selected Letters (1800–1840). (The Book Guild Ltd, 1992)
Hughes, Patricia, Anne Lister's Secret Diary for 1817. (Hues Books Ltd 2006)
Hughes, Patricia, The Secret Life of Miss Anne Lister and the Curious Tale of Miss Eliza Raine. (Hues Books Ltd 2010)
Khoroshilova, Olga, Gentleman Jack in Russia. (in Russian, Moscow, Mann, Ivanov & Ferber 2022)
Liddington, Jill, Presenting the Past: Anne Lister of Halifax, 1791–1840. (Pennine Pens, 1994)
 Liddington, Jill, Female Fortune: Land, Gender and Authority: The Anne Lister Diaries and Other Writings, 1833–36. (Rivers Oram Press, 1998)
Steidele, Angela, Gentleman Jack. A Biography of Anne Lister: Regency Landowner, Seducer and Secret Diarist. (Serpent's Tail, London 2018). First published as Anne Lister. Eine erotische Biographie. (Matthes & Seitz Berlin, 2017)
Vicinus, Martha, Intimate Friends: Women Who Loved Women, 1778–1928. (University of Chicago Press, 2004)
Whitbread, Helena, I Know My Own Heart: The Diaries of Anne Lister 1791–1840. (Virago, 1988)
Whitbread, Helena, No Priest But Love: Excerpts from the Diaries of Anne Lister. (NYU Press, 1993)

External links

Anne Lister's encoded diary – shows scanned images of Anne Lister's encoded diary pages
Anne Lister page at From History to Her Story: Yorkshire Women's lives on-line – provides excerpts of her translated diaries, as well as images from the original
Site of Anne Lister's family grave 
Saint Ann's Church

The West Yorkshire Archive Service, which holds the Anne Lister Diaries at its Calderdale office

1791 births
1840 deaths
19th-century Anglicans
19th-century diarists
19th-century English businesspeople
19th-century English businesswomen
19th-century LGBT people
19th-century women writers
British landlords
English Anglicans
English diarists
English landowners
English lesbian writers
Female-to-male cross-dressers
LGBT Anglicans
British LGBT businesspeople
LGBT history in England
Memory of the World Register
People from Halifax, West Yorkshire
Pyrénéistes
Women diarists
Women of the Regency era
Writers from Yorkshire